The Showman is a 1930 animated film directed by Dick Huemer and Sid Marcus.

Plot
A vaudeville event is being held, and Toby is the main performer. The opening act shows him conducting an orchestra. He would also play a piano while suspending on a trapeze. Toby then resumes conducting the orchestra while simultaneously moving a long bow with his tail to play three violins.

Other acts in the event features three hornless cows doing ballet. Another one features a goldfish which steps out of the fish bowl to dance on the rim. Next, a trio of emus dance back and forth, side by side.

For the finale, Toby wears a tutu and performs a little ballet. After undressing, he plays a flute, and a puffer fish duets with him. As they mightily put effort to their music, the puffer fish inflates so much until it bursts. Though only the skeleton is left of it, the fish is still somewhat alive. The live audience enjoys the show and therefore applauds as the curtain goes down. But when the curtain falls off and Toby is still on stage, the audience hurls objects at him, prompting the dog and even the skeletal fish to run.

References

External links
The Showman at the Big Cartoon Database

1930 animated films
1930 films
American animated short films
American black-and-white films
1930 comedy films
Films about dogs
1930s rediscovered films
1930s American animated films
Rediscovered American films
1930s English-language films
American comedy short films